Alice Wetterlund (born May 16, 1981) is an American stand-up comedian, actress, and podcast host. She played Carla Walton on the HBO sitcom Silicon Valley, and currently plays D'Arcy Bloom on the SyFy TV series Resident Alien.

Early life and education
Wetterlund was born in Minnesota and relocated to New York City in 1999, where she attended Cooper Union.

Career
She began doing stand-up comedy in the late 2000s, and performed with the Upright Citizens Brigade Theatre improv group from 2008 on. This led to an audition for MTV's Girl Code, where one of her notable parts was in a parody TV commercial for "Culture Culture Probiotics" - a "cure" for diarrhea. Since then, she has been featured in many television commercials for companies such as BMW, Lenscrafters, Scotch Brite and Southwest Airlines. She has appeared on Cave Comedy Radio as a teacher of meditation and cat whispering. 

Wetterlund and Veronica Osorio co-host the Star Trek: The Next Generation podcast Treks and the City. Wetterlund and Kevin Porter co-host the Maisel Goys (hosted under the Gilmore Guys podcast) about Amazon Prime's television series The Marvelous Mrs. Maisel. She currently plays D'Arcy Bloom in the Syfy series Resident Alien.

Personal life
Wetterlund married comedian Andy Haynes on September 20, 2011; they divorced two years later.

Filmography

Film

Television

References

External links 

 – Article in Slate by Wetterlund

Living people
American women comedians
1981 births
American film actresses
American television actresses
21st-century American actresses
Actresses from Minnesota
Cooper Union alumni
Comedians from Minnesota
American stand-up comedians
21st-century American comedians